Nigel Faletoese Vagana (born 7 February 1975), also known by the nicknames of "Pablo", and "Chiko", is a former professional rugby league footballer who played in the 1990s and 2000s, as a  and  . A New Zealand and Samoa international representative, he retired as the Kiwis' all-time top try-scorer with 19. Vagana played club football in New Zealand for the Warriors, in England for Warrington, and in Australia for the Canterbury-Bankstown Bulldogs, Cronulla-Sutherland Sharks and the South Sydney Rabbitohs. Vagana represented the New Zealand national team 32 times between 1998 and 2006, including playing in the 2000 World Cup. He is also the cousin of Bradford Bulls prop-forward Joe Vagana, and former Silver Ferns netball player Linda Vagana.

Background
Of Samoan descent, Vagana was born in Auckland, New Zealand on 7 February 1975.

Playing career

1990s
Vagana was selected as part of the Samoa national team for the 1995 World Cup, but did not play a game. During the 1996 Auckland Warriors season Vagana made his first Premiership appearance for the club at centre. He also was selected in the New Zealand team that competed in the Super League World Nines tournament in Fiji. The side won the title, New Zealand's first world trophy.

The following year he returned to Auckland and resumed playing at centre for the Warriors in the newly formed National Rugby League alongside his cousin Joe Vagana. He was selected to make his début for the New Zealand national team in the 1998 Anzac Test against Australia from the internchange bench. Vagana finished the 1998 Auckland Warriors season as the club's top try scorer.

Vagana finished the 1999 Auckland Warriors season second only to Stacey Jones in total tries scored for the club. He was selected for the New Zealand team to compete in the end of season 1999 Tri-Nations tournament. In the final against Australia he played on the wing and scored a try in the Kiwis' 22–20 loss. He was the tournament's top try-scorer.

2000s
Vagana was selected to play for New Zealand on the wing in the 2000 Anzac Test. He finished the 2000 Auckland Warriors season as the club's top try-scorer. Vagana was then selected in the New Zealand squad for the 2000 World Cup. The Kiwis reached the final against Australia, and he played on the wing in the loss to the Kangaroos.

Vagana commenced playing for Sydney's Canterbury-Bankstown for the 2001 NRL season. At the 2001 Dally M Awards Vagana was named the NRL's centre of the year.

In April 2002, Vagana became the first Canterbury player since 1942 to score five tries in a match. That season he was the League's top try-scorer. At the 2002 Dally M Awards Vagana was named the NRL's centre of the year. He was selected to go on the 2002 New Zealand rugby league tour of Great Britain and France, playing at centre. Clinton Toopi broke his hand in a scuffle with Vagana during a team drinking session after the second test. Team management initially tried to cover up the incident, claiming the injury occurred during the match, before media found out and had a field day. Vagana played in all five test matches of the tour.

During the 2002 NRL season the ladder-leading Canterbury were stripped all competition points and given record-breaking fines for salary cap breaches, meaning they finished the season with the wooden spoon.

Vagana moved to another Sydney club, the Cronulla-Sutherland Sharks for the 2004 NRL season. He was selected to play for New Zealand at fullback in the 2004 Anzac Test. Vagana finished the 2004 Cronulla-Sutherland Sharks season at the club's top try-scorer. In the post-season 2004 Tri-Nations tournament Vagana was selected to play in the centres for New Zealand in all four of their matches.

Vagana was selected play for New Zealand at centre in the 2005 Anzac Test.

Vagana announced his retirement from international rugby league following the 2006 Tri Nations series.

Vagana signed a two-year contract with NRL club South Sydney, starting in 2007, expiring at the end of 2008. At the end of the 2007 NRL season the 2007 All Golds tour took place, celebrating the centenary of the 1907–08 New Zealand rugby tour of Australia and Great Britain, which saw the first games of rugby league ever played in the Southern hemisphere. Vagana came out of international retirement to play for an invitational "All Golds" side against Great Britain.
The 2008 season was Vagana's last in the NRL. Although already retired, Vagana was named in the Samoa squad for the post-season 2008 World Cup, and captained the side in the tournament, scoring tries in both their matches.

Honours
2001 - Dally M Centre of the Year 
2002 - Dally M Centre of the Year

Post playing
Following his retirement from the playing field, Vagana became a National Rugby League education and welfare officer.

References

External links

International player profile
Canterbury Bulldogs profile
Nigel Vagana Souths Profile
Statistics at stats.rleague.com

1975 births
Living people
Canterbury-Bankstown Bulldogs players
Cronulla-Sutherland Sharks players
Junior Kiwis players
New Zealand national rugby league team captains
New Zealand national rugby league team players
New Zealand sportspeople of Samoan descent
New Zealand rugby league players
New Zealand Warriors players
People educated at St Paul's College, Auckland
Richmond Bulldogs players
Rugby league centres
Rugby league five-eighths
Rugby league fullbacks
Rugby league players from Auckland
Rugby league wingers
Samoa national rugby league team captains
Samoa national rugby league team players
South Sydney Rabbitohs players
Warrington Wolves players